Masazumi (written:  or ) is a masculine Japanese given name. Notable people with the name include:

, Japanese politician
, Japanese physician
, Japanese samurai and daimyō
, Japanese general
, Japanese composer, music arranger and guitarist
, Japanese Paralympic wheelchair racer
, Japanese cyclist

Japanese masculine given names